The 2018–19 Men's England Hockey League season was the 2018–19 season of England's field hockey league structure. The season started on 22 September 2018 until 14 April, with a winter break in December and January for the Indoor season.

Surbiton topped the regular season table but Hampstead and Westminster sealed the Championship after winning the playoffs. Bowdon Hockey Club won the season ending Cup competition.

Final standings

Premier League

League Finals Weekend

Semi-finals

Final
(Held at Lee Valley)

Hampstead
Tobias Reynolds-Cotterill (gk), Stephen Kelly, Richard Smith, Marc Edwards, Toby Roche (c), Rupert Shipperley, Paul Melkert, Samuel French, Matt Guise Brown, Harry Martin, Kwan Browne; subs-Jonny Gooch, James Oates, Chris Cargo, Will Calnan, Rhodri Furlong, Kei Kaeppeler

Surbiton
Harry Gibson (gk), Luke Taylor, Ben Boon, Jonathan Gall (c), David Beckett, Zachary Wallace, James Royce, Alan Forsyth, Brendan Creed, David Goodfield, James Gall; subs-Tom Sorsby, Lewis Prosser, Arjan Drayton Chana, Hayden Beltz, Sam Spencer, Nicky Parkes

England Hockey Men's Championship Cup

Quarter-finals

Semi-finals

Final 
(held at Lee Valley)

Bowdon
James Mazarelo, Oliver Stoddart, Daniel Campbell, Samuel Cooke, Hugh Wickert, Richie Dawson-Smith, David Egerton, Thomas Ainsworth, William Tobin, Matt Steventon, Archie Phillips, Lee Parry, Sam Apoola, James Vallely, Ben White, Elliot White.

Canterbury
Joshua Izzard, James Henderson, Tom Bean, Toby Vaughan, Jack Balsdon, Louis Ridge, William Mead, Craig Boyne, Matt Burton-Bowen, William Heywood, Teague Marcano, Thomas Degiovanni, Matthew Carney, Adam Lee-Browne, Nathan Redman, Patrick Brookson.

See also
2018–19 Women's England Hockey League season

References

2018-19
England
2018 in English sport
2019 in English sport